Her-Day is the fifth album by Masami Okui, released on August 27, 1999.

Track listing
M2000 ~Prologue~ (instrumental)
 Composition: Masami Okui. Toshiro Yabuki
 Arrangement: Toshiro Yabuki
labyrinth (star version)
 Anime films Cyber Team in Akihabara image song
 Lyrics: Masami Okui
 Composition, arrangement: Toshiro Yabuki
Ketsumatsu
 Lyrics: Masami Okui
 Composition, arrangement: Toshiro Yabuki, Hideki Sato

 Lyrics: Masami Okui
 Composition, arrangement: Toshiro Yabuki

 anime television series Starship Girl Yamamoto Yohko ending song
 Lyrics, composition: Masami Okui
 Arrangement: Toshiro Yabuki
Key
 Radio drama Cyber Team in Akihabara theme song
 Lyrics: Masami Okui
 Composition, arrangement: Toshiro Yabuki

 Lyrics: Masami Okui
 Composition: Masami Okui, Toshiro Yabuki
 Arrangement: Toshiro Yabuki

 Lyrics: Masami Okui
 Composition, arrangement: Toshiro Yabuki
 (M.original mix)
 Anime film Cyber Team in Akihabara soundtrack
 Lyrics: Masami Okui
 Composition, arrangement: Toshiro Yabuki
 （type R mix）
 anime television series Starship Girl Yamamoto Yohko opening song
 Lyrics: Masami Okui
 Composition, arrangement: Toshiro Yabuki
Love Sick
 Lyrics, composition: Masami Okui
 Arrangement: Toshiro Yabuki, Hideki Sato
Kitto Ashita wa
 anime television series Ojamajo Doremi ending song
 Lyrics: Masami Okui
 Composition, arrangement: Toshiro Yabuki
Hot Spice (M.original mix)
 Anime film Cyber Team in Akihabara soundtrack
 Lyrics: Masami Okui
 Composition, arrangement: Toshiro Yabuki
 （H-D mix） 
 Anime film Revolutionary Girl Utena soundtrack
 Lyrics: Masami Okui
 Composition, arrangement: Toshiro Yabuki
In This Arm
 anime television series Slayers image song
 Lyrics, composition: Masami Okui
 Arrangement: Toshiro Yabuki
Never die
 OVA Slayers Excellent theme song
 Lyrics: Masami Okui
 Composition, arrangement: Toshiro Yabuki

 Lyrics, composition: Masami Okui
 Arrangement: Tsutomu Ohira

Sources
Official website: Makusonia

1999 albums
Masami Okui albums